The Philip Neill Memorial Prize is an annual prize administered by the University of Otago for excellence in original composition. The award is open to all past and present students of a university in New Zealand, except previous winners who are excluded for a period of five years.

It was established in 1943 in memory of Philip Foster Neill, a medical student at the University of Otago who died during the polio outbreak of 1943. In the first year of the prize, 1944, the topic was for a prelude (or fantasia) and fugue for either piano or organ. Douglas Lilburn was publicly awarded the first prize of £25 on 25 June 1944, with Harry Luscombe of Auckland the runner-up. It is the longest continuously running award of its kind in New Zealand.

The prize is determined each year with a set task with different parameters each year, usually relating to duration and instrumentation, which are announced early in the year, with a deadline for submission at the beginning of July. The prize is not always awarded.

List of award recipients

 1944 Douglas Lilburn for Prelude and Fugue in G Minor for organ 
 1945 Harry Luscombe for Sonata in G major for violin and piano
 1946 Frank Callaway for Theme and Variations for String Orchestra
 1947 tied between Dorothy Scott for In a younger Land, a song cycle for mezzo-soprano and violin, cello and piano and Dorothea Anne Franchi for The Desolate Star a song cycle for baritone and piano setting text by Robin Hyde  
 1948 John Ritchie for Passacaglia and fugue on an original theme for two pianos
 1949 Charles Martin for Sonata for pianoforte and violin
 1950 Claire Neale for Variations on an original theme in the phyrgian mode, with a ground bass finale
 1951 Georgina Smith for Theme and Variations [for two pianos]
 1952 Leslie Pearce Williamson Jordan for Fantasy-sonata for cello and piano 
 1953 No award 
 1954 Nigel Eastgate 
 1955, 1956, 1957 No award 
 1958 Barry Vercoe for A Program Suite for Oboe, Clarinet and Bassoon 
 1959 Dorothy Freed for Variations for woodwind quintet and Philip Hodgson 
 1960, 1961 No award 
 1962 shared between Robin Maconie for Basia Memoranda for lyric tenor and string quartet and Graham Hollobon for Elegy, a song cycle setting text by Alastair Campbell  
 1963 William Southgate for Toccata for Brass Choir and Jenny McLeod 
 1964 No award 
 1965 Jack Body for Cantata for the festival of dedication of a church 
 1966 William Hawkey 
 1967, 1968 No award 
 1969 Noel Sanders 
 1970 Gillian Bibby for Sanctuary of the Spirits, a children's opera,
 1971 John Rimmer for Composition 2 
 1972 Christopher Norton 
 1973, 1974, 1975, 1976, 1977 No award 
 1978 David Hamilton for Canticle 1 for oboe, baritone and piano. 
 1979 Peter Adams for Sings Daphne for Soprano, Clarinet and Piano 
 1980 John Ritchie for Three Housman Songs 
 1981 No award 
 1982 Helen Caskie for Rhapsody for violin and piano 
 1983 No award 
 1984 Richard Francis for Song-cycle (Auden) for Baritone and Pianoforte 
 1985 Nigel Keay for Variations for piano 
 1986 No award 
 1987 Eve de Castro-Robinson for Undercurrents for solo clarinet 
 1988, 1989, 1990 No award 
 1991 Maria Grenfell for A Pinch of time ; five songs for bass-baritone and piano setting poems by Hone Tuwhare, Kevin Ireland and Allen Curnow 
 1992 John Elmsly for Songs from 'The Treehouse' for SATB choir 
 1993 Eve de Castro-Robinson for Split the Lark for violin and piano 
 1994 Tecwyn Evans for Gerauschvoll for organ
 1995 Christopher Marshall for Three Aspects of Spring 
 1995 Dorothy Buchanan for Fragments and Letters for voice, clarinet and piano. 
 1996 Cheryl Camm for Three Burns Songs for Soprano, Clarinet and Cello 
 1996 Michael Norris 
 1997 David Farquhar for Prospero 
 1998 No award 
 1999 Jeroen Speak for Etudes. 
 2000 Leonie Holmes for A Tedious Brief Scene: Bottom's Dance for mixed chamber ensemble of nine players 
 2001 No award 
 2002 Thorsten Wollman for Fishes and Birds for flute or violin, clarinet and piano 
 2003 John Rimmer for Bowed Insights for string quartet 
 2004 Robin Toan for Maze for piano and two percussionists 
 2005 No award 
 2006 Carol Shortis for The Riddle of her flight 
 2007 Brian Bromberg  
 2008 Chris Adams for Persephone for String Quartet 
 2009 Jack Body for Mediations on Michelangelo 
 2010 No award 
 2011 Alex Campbell-Hunt for Piano Trio 
 2012 Corwin Newall for Scientists (Part 1) 
 2013 Kerian Veraine for Crave Release for violin and piano 
 2014 Linda Dallimore for Syria: In Empathy for oboe and piano
 2015 Jeremy Mayall for Frosted Air Suite for flute and electronics 
 2016 Reuben Jelleyman for Soliloquy for Cello 
 2017 No award 
 2018 Corwin Newall for #babylife for piano duet 
 2019 Megan Kyte for Entends 
 2020 David Hamilton for Canticle 6: Fragments from Lorca for Mezzo, Violin and Piano, highly commended Chris Adams for Dowland Fragments for Mezzo, Violin and Piano
 2021 Ben Hoadley for Four Preludes for cello and piano

References 

Classical music awards
Awards and prizes of the University of Otago
Music competitions in New Zealand
New Zealand music awards